El Olivar may refer to:

El Olivar, Spain
Olivar, in Chile